The 2003 Rose Bowl was a college football bowl game played on January 1, 2003. It was the 89th Rose Bowl game. It was a match-up between the Oklahoma Sooners and the Washington State Cougars. Oklahoma led 27–0 in the fourth quarter and won, 34–14. Sooner quarterback Nate Hybl was named the Player Of The Game.

Pre-Game Activities
The Pasadena Tournament of Roses chooses their co-Grand Marshals of the 114th annual Rose Parade, they are: Actor/Comedian Bill Cosby, Art Linkletter and Fred Rogers from Mister Rogers' Neighborhood on PBS.

On Tuesday, October 22, 2002 - Tournament of Roses President Gary L. Thomas selects 17-year-old Alexandra Wucetich, a senior at San Marino High School & a resident of San Marino, California to become the 85th Rose Queen to reign over the 114th Tournament of Roses Parade and the 89th Rose Bowl Game.

Members of the court are: Princesses Anjali Agrawal, Arcadia, La Salle High School; Heather Bell, Pasadena, John Muir High School; Katherine Berber, San Marino, Flintridge Sacred Heart Academy; Glynn Joseph, Altadena, Flintridge Sacred Heart Academy; Megan Maclennan, Pasadena, Polytechnic School; and Danielle Yamamoto, La Canada Flintridge, La Canada High School.

Teams

Prior to the BCS, this pairing never would have occurred. Oklahoma came into the game Big 12 Champions, while Washington State came in co-champions of the Pac-10. The Rose Bowl normally features the champions of the Big Ten and the Pac-10. However, because the Buckeyes had finished second in the BCS, they were set to play in the Fiesta Bowl for the national championship against the Miami Hurricanes. Earlier in the season, Ohio State had defeated Washington State 25–7.

The Orange Bowl had the next pick after the Fiesta Bowl pairing, and #3 (#5 BCS) Iowa was chosen. The Rose Bowl had the next BCS selection. The next, best available team to choose was #8 (#7 BCS) Oklahoma, who won the Big 12 Championship Game, to play Pac-10 winner Washington State. When it came time for the Orange Bowl and Sugar Bowl to make a second pick, both wanted the fifth-ranked USC Trojans. However, a BCS rule stated that if two bowls want the same team, the bowl with the higher payoff has the option. The Orange Bowl immediately extended an at-large bid to the Trojans and paired them with at-large number 3 Iowa in a Big Ten/Pac-10 "Rose Bowl" matchup in the Orange Bowl. Rose Bowl committee executive director Mitch Dorger was not pleased with the results. This left the Sugar Bowl with #14 BCS Florida State, the winner of the Atlantic Coast Conference. Notre Dame at 10–2 and #9 in the BCS standings was invited to the Gator Bowl. Kansas State at #8 also was left out.

Oklahoma Sooners
The Sooners won the Big 12 South and defeated Colorado in the Big 12 Championship Game. Kansas State, although ranked higher in the AP poll, lost to Colorado in the Big 12 North, and could not play in the championship game.

Game summary

Statistics

Aftermath
This game drew one of the lowest attendance numbers in the modern history of the Rose Bowl. It was the first time that the stadium held less than the nominal capacity for the Rose Bowl game since before the 1947 Rose Bowl and the agreement between the Pacific Coast and Big Ten conferences. The 1944 game had the third smallest crowd played in the Rose Bowl stadium at 68,000. The 1931 edition had the second smallest crowd at 60,000. The smallest crowd at the Rose Bowl stadium was the 1934 Rose Bowl at 35,000. Former University of Michigan coach Bo Schembechler remarked, "Didn't watch it," when asked what he thought of this game and also about the Nebraska-Miami Rose Bowl the previous year

During the early 2010s cycle of conference realignment, the Pac-10 eyed six Big 12 members as possible additions to the conference, including Oklahoma. However, the only Big 12 school that did join the Pac-10 (now the Pac-12) was Colorado.

References

Rose Bowl
Rose Bowl Game
Oklahoma Sooners football bowl games
Washington State Cougars football bowl games
Rose Bowl
January 2003 sports events in the United States
21st century in Pasadena, California